The 2017 Apache Warrior 400 presented by Lucas Oil was a Monster Energy NASCAR Cup Series race that was held on October 1, 2017, at Dover International Speedway in Dover, Delaware. Contested over 400 laps on the one-mile (1.6 km) concrete speedway, it was the 29th race of the 2017 Monster Energy NASCAR Cup Series season, third race of the Playoffs and final race of the Round of 16.

Report

Background

Dover International Speedway (formerly Dover Downs International Speedway) is a race track in Dover, Delaware, United States. Since opening in 1969, it has held at least two NASCAR races. In addition to NASCAR, the track also hosted USAC and the Verizon IndyCar Series. The track features one layout, a  concrete oval, with 24° banking in the turns and 9° banking on the straights. The speedway is owned and operated by Dover Motorsports.

The track, nicknamed "The Monster Mile", was built in 1969 by Melvin Joseph of Melvin L. Joseph Construction Company, Inc., with an asphalt surface, but was replaced with concrete in 1995. Six years later in 2001, the track's capacity moved to 135,000 seats, making the track have the largest capacity of sports venue in the mid-Atlantic. In 2002, the name changed to Dover International Speedway from Dover Downs International Speedway after Dover Downs Gaming and Entertainment split, making Dover Motorsports. From 2007 to 2009, the speedway worked on an improvement project called "The Monster Makeover", which expanded facilities at the track and beautified the track. After the 2014 season, the track's capacity was reduced to 95,500 seats.

Entry list

First practice

Qualifying

Qualifying results

Practice (post-qualifying)

Second practice

Final practice

Race

First stage
Martin Truex Jr. led the field to the green flag and led the early part of the race. On lap 25, Kyle Larson took the lead from Truex. Larson would lead the race until Truex regained the lead on lap 60. On lap 82, a round of green-flag pit stops began. On lap 86, the first caution of the race came out during green-flag pit stops when Jeffrey Earnhardt spun coming into pit road and hit the barrels at the entrance to pit road. At the time of the caution, Kyle Busch was leading as he and a few other drivers had yet to pit including Brad Keselowski, Ricky Stenhouse Jr., Danica Patrick, and David Ragan. The race would be red-flagged for 15 minutes to replace the barrels at the entrance to pit road. The leaders pitted on lap 88 and Keselowski won the battle off pit road. The race returned to green flag on lap 93 and Keselowski would hold onto the lead to win Stage 1, which concluded on lap 120.

Second stage

After the first stage ended, the second caution of the race came out. The leaders pitted, and Kyle Busch left pit road first. Matt Kenseth was penalized for speeding on pit road. The race returned to green on lap 128 and Kyle Busch would continue to lead. On lap 151, Larson took the lead from Kyle Busch. On lap 167, the third caution of the race came out when Reed Sorenson blew an engine. Under this caution, the leaders pitted and Truex won the battle off pit road. The green flag came back out on lap 174 and Truex initially held the lead until getting passed by Larson in turn 2. On lap 219, Kevin Harvick made an unscheduled green-flag pit stop for a vibration. Larson held onto the lead and won Stage 2, which ended on lap 240.

Final stage
Following the conclusion of the second stage, the fourth caution of the race came out. The leaders came to pit road under the caution and Larson maintained the lead. However, Larson could not maintain speed after having to shut off his engine and restart it, which dropped him back to fifth for the restart and gave Chase Elliott the lead. The green flag came back out on lap 249 and Elliott held onto the lead. Elliott's lead would continue to grow as the race remained green. On lap 319, a round of green-flag pit stops began. Race leader Elliott pitted on lap 325, giving the lead to Kyle Busch, he pitted 5 laps later and gave the lead to Jimmie Johnson. Under this round of pit stops, Kurt Busch had a commitment line violation. Johnson pitted from the lead on lap 334 and gave the lead to Keselowski.  He, Austin Dillon. and Ricky Stenhouse Jr. pitted on lap 340 to complete the cycle of green-flag pit stops and give the lead back to Elliott. Elliott continued to hold onto the lead. On lap 373, Denny Hamlin hit the wall and slowed down on the track. He was able to make it to pit road with a broken axle with the race remaining green. In the closing laps, Kyle Busch started catching Elliott as Elliott was getting caught in lapped traffic. Coming to the white flag on lap 399, Kyle Busch took the lead from Elliott. Kyle Busch held onto the lead to win the race. Following the race, Ryan Newman, Austin Dillon, Kurt Busch, and Kasey Kahne were eliminated from the playoffs.

Race results

Stage results

Stage 1
Laps: 120

Stage 2
Laps: 120

Final stage results

Stage 3
Laps: 160

Race statistics
 Lead changes: 6 among different drivers
 Cautions/Laps: 4 for 24
 Red flags: 1 for 15 minutes and 9 seconds
 Time of race: 3 hours, 5 minutes and 48 seconds
 Average speed:

Media

Television
NBC Sports covered the race on the television side. Rick Allen, 2006 race winner Jeff Burton and Steve Letarte had the call in the booth for the race. Dave Burns, Parker Kligerman, Marty Snider and Kelli Stavast reported from pit lane during the race.

Radio
MRN had the radio call for the race, which was simulcast on Sirius XM NASCAR Radio.

Standings after the race

Drivers' Championship standings

Manufacturers' Championship standings

Note: Only the first 16 positions are included for the driver standings.

References

Apache Warrior 400
Apache Warrior 400
NASCAR races at Dover Motor Speedway
Apache Warrior 400